Freaky Deaky may refer to:
 Freaky Deaky, a 1988 novel by Elmore Leonard
 "Freaky Deaky" (song), a 2022 song by American rappers Tyga and Doja Cat
 "Freaky Deaky", a 2008 song by Flo Rida from Mail on Sunday
 Freaky Deaky (film), a 2012 crime-comedy-thriller, based on the novel
 Freaky Deaky Music Festival, Chicago, Illinois